Any Day Now is a 1988 album by The Legendary Pink Dots.

Track listing

(*) Included only on CD versions – taken from the Under Glass 12".

Personnel
The Prophet Qa'Sepel (Edward Ka-Spel)
The Silver Man (Phil Knight)
Stret Majest Alarme (Barry Gray)
Patrick Q (Wright)
Graham Whitehead
Jason (Salmon)

Additional personnel
Lady Sunshine (Marylou Busch) – vocals (on track 1)
Tony Copier – drums (on tracks 2 and 8)
Hanz Myre – baritone saxophone (on track 2), sound processing

Notes
The SPV edition contains different artwork than that of the other editions.

References

1988 albums
The Legendary Pink Dots albums
PIAS Recordings albums
SPV GmbH albums
Wax Trax! Records albums